Charles Mayes Wigg, born at Nottingham, England on 13 January 1889 and died at Eastbourne on 2 March 1969, was an English artist.

Biography
The eldest son of Mayes Wigg, a bank manager, and Agnes Wigg (formerly Sudbury), he grew up at Watton and Cromer in Norfolk and was educated at Gresham's School. In 1911, he arrived at the Norwich School of Art and later studied with Frank Spenlove-Spenlove at his Yellow Door School of Art in Beckenham, Kent.

During the First World War, Wigg served with the British Army and saw active service at Gaza. In 1916, he was invalided out of the army with severe leg injuries, and was left with a disability for the rest of his life.

Returning to his career as an artist and illustrator, he subsequently found life afloat easier than life on land and for many years lived and painted in a house- boat on the Norfolk Broads. He also had studios at The Thatched House, Brundall, his parents' home, and at Rose Cottage, Barton Turf.

In 1952, Wigg married his mother's nurse, but this was disastrous for his artistic career. His new wife prevented him from painting, breaking his brushes and burning his paintings. Later, he tried to take up his work again but failed to achieve what he wanted. He died at St Mary's Hospital, Eastbourne, on 2 March 1969, leaving an estate of £47,510. At the time of his death, he was living at East Hoathly, Sussex.

Works
Wigg was a landscape artist working mostly in watercolours and as an etcher, with only occasional paintings in oils. The Norfolk coast and scenery of the Broads gave him the subjects for his work, and his etchings were mostly of boats. He exhibited regularly at the Norwich Art Circle between 1909 and 1936, at the Royal Academy in 1915 and also with the British Water-colour Society.

References

External links
 Charles Mayes Wigg on Artnet
 Charles Mayes Wigg at Artprice.com

1889 births
1969 deaths
Alumni of Norwich University of the Arts
Artists from Nottingham
British Army personnel of World War I
English artists
People educated at Gresham's School
People from Cromer
People from East Hoathly
People from Watton, Norfolk